Miklós Radnóti (born Miklós Glatter; 5 May 1909 – November 1944) was a Hungarian poet and teacher. He was murdered in the Holocaust.

Biography
Miklós Glatter was the son of a vendor of the textile business company Brück & Grosz in Budapest. He was born in the 13th district quarter Újlipótváros of the Royal Hungarian capital city of Austria-Hungary. At birth, his twin brother was born dead and his mother died soon after childbirth. He spent most of his childhood years with his aunt's family whose husband Dezső Grosz was one of the owners of the textile company in which his father worked until his death in 1921.

Radnóti attended primary and secondary school in his place of birth and continued his education at the high school for textile industry in Liberec from 1927–28 on his uncle's advice. Then he worked as commercial correspondent in the familiar textile business company until 1930. Ultimately, Radnóti was able to prevail with desire for another education and began studying philosophy, Hungarian and French language at the University of Szeged. 

In 1934, he finished his studies with the philosophical doctoral thesis The artistic development of Margit Kaffka. After graduation, he changed his name to Radnóti, after the birthplace Radnovce (Hungarian: Radnót) of his paternal grandfather. In August 1935, he married his long-standing love Fanny (1912-2014), daughter of the owner of the respected Gyarmati printing house. The very happy marriage was unfortunately childless until his deportation. In the school year of 1935-36 he gained first professional experiences as high school teacher at the Zsigmond Kemény Gymnasium in Budapest. 

In September 1940, he was conscripted to a Jewish labor battalion of the Hungarian Army until December of that year, then from July 1942 to April 1943 for the second time. On 2 May 1943, he converted together with his wife from Judaism to Roman Catholic faith. In May 1944, Radnóti's third military service started and his battalion was deported to Bor in Serbia. After 1943, Hungarian-Jewish forced laborers were imprisoned nearby Bor's copper mines which covered 50 percent of the copper requirement of the German war industry. 

On 17 September 1944, Radnóti was forced to leave the camp in a column of about 3,600 prisoners because of the military offensive by Allied armies. He sustained the inhuman forced march from Bor to Szentkirályszabadja, where he wrote his last poem on 31 October. In November 1944, he and twenty other prisoners were shot and killed by members of the Hungarian Guards because of their total physical and mental exhaustion. Different dates of his murder have been given. Some publications specify a day in the period from 6 to 10 November. In the detailed and scientific exhibition of 2009 by the Hungarian Academy of Sciences, 4 November was said to be the date of death. Today it takes about 1 hour and 30 minutes to drive the 110 kilometers by car from Szentkirályszabadja to Abda. Radnóti is buried in the Kerepesi Cemetery with his wife. In 2013, his statue in Abda was damaged, but the reason for the damage has still not been clarified.

Bibliography (selection)
 Pogány köszöntő (Pagan Greeting), Kortárs, Budapest 1930.
 Újmódi pásztorok éneke (Songs of Modern Shepherds), Fiatal Magyarország, Budapest 1931.
 Lábadozó szél (Convalescent Wind), Fiatalok Müvészeti Kollégiumának kiadása,  Szeged 1933.
 Újhold (New Moon), Fiatalok Müvészeti Kollégiumának kiadása, Szeged 1935.
 Járkálj csak, halálraítélt! (Just Walk Around, Condemned!), Nyugat Kiadása, Budapest 1936.
 Meredek út (Steep Road), Cserépfalvi, Budapest 1938.
 Naptár (Calendar), Hungária, Budapest 1942.
 Orpheus nyomában : műfordítások kétezer év költőiből (In the Footsteps of Orpheus: Translations of Poetry of Two Thousand Year Old Poets), Pharos, Budapest 1943.
 Tajtékos ég (Foamy Sky), Révai, Budapest 1946.
 Radnóti Miklós művei (Works of Miklos Radnoti), Szepirodalmi Konyvkiado, Budapest 1978, biography by 
   Miklós Radnóti, The Complete Poetry in Hungarian and English, McFarland & Company, Jefferson 2014, 

Miklós Radnóti was Hungarian translator of works by Jean de La Fontaine and Guillaume Apollinaire.

Reviews
 Findlay, Bill (1980), review of Forced March, in Cencrastus No. 2, Spring 1980, pp. 45 & 46,

Image Gallery

Articles
History of the Jews in Hungary
Hungary during World War II
The Holocaust

References 

1909 births
1944 deaths 
1944 murders in Hungary
Writers from Budapest
People from the Kingdom of Hungary
Catholic poets
Christian poets
Hungarian Jews who died in the Holocaust
Hungarian Roman Catholics
20th-century Hungarian poets
Hungarian male poets
Jewish poets
Converts to Roman Catholicism from Judaism
People murdered in Hungary
Deaths by firearm in Hungary
Burials at Kerepesi Cemetery
Hungarian twins
20th-century Hungarian male writers
Baumgarten Prize winners
World War II poets
Hungarian civilians killed in World War II
Hungarian World War II forced labourers